Ilex sclerophylla is a species of plant in the family Aquifoliaceae. It is a tree endemic to Peninsular Malaysia.

References

sclerophylla
Endemic flora of Peninsular Malaysia
Trees of Peninsular Malaysia
Conservation dependent plants
Taxonomy articles created by Polbot
Taxa named by Joseph Dalton Hooker